Maggie MacDonnell is a Canadian educator and development practitioner who became the third recipient of the teaching prize award Global Teacher Prize, a $1 million award from Varkey Foundation. The prize was presented by the prime minister and vice president of the UAE, and the ruler of Emirate of Dubai Sheikh Mohammed bin Rashid Al Maktoum. Maggie is teaching students at Salluit village, where temperature often drops as low as −13 °C to −25 °C in winter.

Biography 
Maggie was born and raised in Nova Scotia of eastern Canada, and has completed Master's degree from a Canadian university. She works with Congolese refugees for their rehabilitation and Tanzanian HIV/AIDS activists to counsel socially affected patients. In an isolated area of Arctic Canada, Maggie teaches student "especially girls" at higher secondary level and boys aged between 13 to 18. Before serving as a teacher, the country's isolated area was claimed to had been suffered with social inequality. She according to the News media restored the "act of kindness" to some extent which brought improvements in Canadian students where she teaches.

Social events
Maggie was initially working in Sub-Saharan Africa before traveling to Salluit where she teaches students for over six years. She conducted several social awareness programs aimed to educate young people who were the victims of depression, alcoholism and drug addiction. Before her arrival to the Inuit village, there was a drop recorded in its education system. She ran programs for young women at school level that prompted up to 500% of raise in enrollment of girls at Inuit schools.

Recognition
She was recognized as one of the BBC's 100 women of 2017.

External links
 Maggie MacDonnell - Global Teacher Prize 2017 - Winner on YouTube

References 

Canadian educators
Year of birth missing (living people)
Living people
Recipients of the Global Teacher Prize
Canadian women academics
Women educational theorists
Canadian educational theorists
BBC 100 Women